Macrobrochis albovenosa is a moth of the family Erebidae. It was described by Karel Černý in 1990. It is found in Thailand.

References

Lithosiina
Moths described in 1990